The 2006 United States House of Representatives elections in Virginia were held on November 7, 2006 to determine who will represent the Commonwealth of Virginia in the United States House of Representatives. Virginia has eleven seats in the House, apportioned according to the 2000 United States Census. Representatives are elected for two-year terms.

Overview

District 1

Incumbent Republican Jo Ann Davis defeated Democrat Shawn M. O'Donnell and Independent Marvin F. Pixton III.

District 2

Incumbent Republican Thelma Drake defeated Democrat Phillip Kellam, the Commissioner of the Revenue for Virginia Beach.

District 3

Incumbent Democrat Bobby Scott was unopposed for an 8th term.

District 4

Incumbent Republican Randy Forbes defeated Independent Green Albert P. Burckard.

District 5

Incumbent Republican Virgil Goode defeated Democrat Al Weed, a vineyard owner and his 2004 opponent.

District 6

Incumbent Republican Bob Goodlatte defeated independents Barbara Jean Pryor and Andre D. Peery.

District 7

Incumbent Republican Eric Cantor defeated Democrat James M. Nachmann and independent W. Brad Blanton.

District 8

Incumbent Democrat Jim Moran defeated Republican Tom M. O'Donoghue and independent Jim Hurysz.

District 9

Long-serving incumbent Democrat Rick Boucher defeated Republican Bill Carrico to win a 13th term.

District 10

Incumbent Republican Frank Wolf, the Dean of the Virginia congressional delegation, defeated Democrat Judy Feder, a professor at Georgetown University, Libertarian Wilbur N. Wood III and independent Neeraj C. Nigam.

District 11

Incumbent Republican Thomas M Davis defeated Democrat Andrew Hurst and Independent Green Joseph Oddo in an unexpectedly close election.

References

See also
 United States House elections, 2006 complete list

Virginia

2006
2006 Virginia elections